Racing Besançon is a French football club based in Besançon. It was founded in 1904. They play at the Stade Léo Lagrange. The club currently competes in the Championnat National 2 the fourth tier of France Football.

History
Founded in 1904 by soldiers, the Racing Club Franc-Comtois Besançon, an omnisports club joined the USFSA. The football section was created in 1905. After having signed some good performances before the Great War (Eastern Champion 1909, 10, 11 and 12), the club was slowed down by hostilities.

Following the 2021–22 season, Racing Besançon was promoted to Championnat National 2 after an eight years absence.

Kit
The club's kit is manufactured by Kappa and primarily consists of red.

Current squad

Staff

Honours
 Championnat National 3 : 2021–22 Group E Winners

References

 
Besançon
Besançon
Sport in Besançon
Football clubs in Bourgogne-Franche-Comté